The Tyler Cup was an association football competition played between clubs in Northern Ireland and the Republic of Ireland. The competition ran from 1978 to 1980, and was similar to the earlier Blaxnit Cup, North-South Cup, Dublin and Belfast Intercity Cup, or the Setanta Sports Cup inaugurated in the 2000s.

Tyler Cup results
The finals were played on a two-leg basis.

External links
 Irish Football Club Project Archive on All-Ireland Competitions
 Irish League Archive - Tyler Cup

References

Defunct all-Ireland association football cup competitions
1978–79 in Republic of Ireland association football
1979–80 in Republic of Ireland association football
1980–81 in Republic of Ireland association football
1978–79 in Northern Ireland association football
1979–80 in Northern Ireland association football
1980–81 in Northern Ireland association football